"Negative" is a song by the English alternative rock band Mansun. The song was written by Paul Draper, Dominic Chad, Stove and Andie Rathbone. It was recorded and produced by Paul Draper and Mark 'Spike' Stent during sessions for the group's second studio album. The song was released as the third single in 1998 from the group's second album, Six. Despite being one of the album's more traditional songs the single peaked low at #27 on the UK Singles Chart, breaking the group's run of seven consecutive top twenty singles.

The music video for "Negative" was directed by Jamie Thraves.

Track listing

Personnel

Mansun
 Dominic Chad – Lead Guitar, Backing Vocals
 Paul Draper – Lead Vocals, Rhythm Guitar
 Andie Rathbone – Drums
 Stove – Bass

Production
Paul Draper and Mark 'Spike' Stent – producer
Mike Hunter – engineer, additional production ("King of Beauty")
Mark 'Spike' Stent - Mixing ("Negative", "When the Wind Blows")
Ian Grimble - Mixing - ("King of Beauty", "I Deserve What I Get", "Take It Easy Chicken (Live)")
Paul Walton – engineer
Jan Kybeert – Pro Tools
Pennie Smith – band photography

Chart positions

References

1998 singles
Mansun songs
Songs written by Paul Draper (musician)
1998 songs
Song recordings produced by Spike Stent
Parlophone singles
Songs written by Dominic Chad
Songs written by Stove King
Songs written by Andie Rathbone